Trio Galleta was a soul rock band formed in 1969 in Mar del Plata, Argentina. It consisted of Carlos Iturbide (guitar, vocals), Juan Carlos Saporiti "Juancho" (drums) and Anibal Tell 'Lolo' (bass).

In 1970, when the trend of singing in English language in Latin America had little acceptance, they released their first album made only of cover versions called Estoy Herido through Odeon Records, with the track list ranging from "Río Verde" ("Green River") by Creedence Clearwater Revival to "Enciende mi Fuego" ("Light My Fire") by The Doors, under the genre that would become known as soul rock. Iturbide had a raspy voice, which was the band's signature trademark.

In 1971, they released an album called Galleta Soul. Their influences on this album were Otis Redding, James Brown, Ray Charles, Stax, Wilson Pickett, Johnnie Taylor, Motown, Jeff Beck Group, Bill Deal and the Rhondels, Steve Cropper, Creedence Clearwater Revival, Southern Soul and Small Faces. Eight of the twelve songs were written by Iturbide and Conte (who were responsible for the lyrics). On the back cover of the album was written that their lyrics ranged from subjects concerning LSD to racial issues.

As a final attempt, in 1975 Iturbide decided to continue the project and reformulated the band's line-up, now a quartet, to include Eduardo Sanz, as a guitarist, Lito Olmos, on bass, and Maria José, on drums. Now just called Galleta, the new self-titled album of the band hits the stores in 1975. The soul rock was still the main genre, but now they started to play hard rock covers of some songs of the British band Ten Years After. In 1975, when it was a turbulent time in Latin America, the album was not warmly received. In Brazil, Iturbide is considered one of the idols of this genre coming from Argentina. One of the band's hits was the song "I Am So Happy." They influenced the Brazilian band The Fevers.

In the 21st-century the band's songs continue to be re-recorded and concerts are made in their tribute.

Discography
Estoy Herido (1970)
Galleta Soul (1971)
Galleta      (1975)

References

Argentine rock music groups
Argentine soul musical groups
Musical groups established in 1969